Boulder Dam is a 1936 American drama film directed by Frank McDonald and written by Sy Bartlett and Ralph Block. The film stars Ross Alexander, Patricia Ellis, Lyle Talbot, Eddie Acuff, Henry O'Neill and Egon Brecher. The film was released by Warner Bros. on March 7, 1936.

Plot
Rusty Noonan is a mechanic in Detroit, Michigan. During an altercation with his boss he kills the man in self-defense. After fleeing Detroit he finds himself in Las Vegas, Nevada. He befriends a woman named Ann and finds work helping construct the Boulder Dam. Eventually Rusty sees the error in his past behavior and sets out to change himself.
Ross Alexander as Rusty Noonan
Patricia Ellis as Ann Vangarick
Lyle Talbot as Lacy
Eddie Acuff as Ed Harper
Henry O'Neill as Mr. Agnew
Egon Brecher as Pa Vangarick
Eleanor Wesselhoeft as Ma Vangarick
Joseph Crehan as Ross
George Breakston as Stan Vangarick 
William Pawley as Wilson
Ronnie Cosby as Peter Vangarick

References

External links 
 

1936 films
Warner Bros. films
American drama films
1936 drama films
Films directed by Frank McDonald
American black-and-white films
1930s English-language films
1930s American films